Kableshkov Ridge (‘Kableshkov Rid’ \'ka-blesh-kov 'rid\) is the rocky ridge extending 4.5 km in east-southeast direction, 1.5 km wide and rising to 678 m on Nordenskjöld Coast in Graham Land, Antarctica.  It is bounded by Zaychar Glacier to the north and Odrin Bay to the southeast, and linked to Detroit Plateau to the west.

The ridge is named after Todor Kableshkov (1851–1876), a leader of the 1876 April Uprising for Bulgarian independence.

Location
British mapping in 1978.

Map
 British Antarctic Territory.  Scale 1:200000 topographic map.  DOS 610 Series, Sheet W 64 60.  Directorate of Overseas Surveys, UK, 1978
 Antarctic Digital Database (ADD). Scale 1:250000 topographic map of Antarctica. Scientific Committee on Antarctic Research (SCAR). Since 1993, regularly upgraded and updated

Notes

References
 Kableshkov Ridge. SCAR Composite Antarctic Gazetteer.
 Bulgarian Antarctic Gazetteer. Antarctic Place-names Commission. (details in Bulgarian, basic data in English)

External links
 Kableshkov Ridge. Copernix satellite image

Ridges of Graham Land
Bulgaria and the Antarctic
Nordenskjöld Coast